Hemiphileurus illatus is a species of rhinoceros beetle in the family Scarabaeidae. Its range is the Southwestern United States, primarily in Arizona.  It does not have a widely-used common name.

Description 

As adults, this species is black or dark reddish-brown with a pitted thorax and elytra. All six legs have short spines. They are 19 - 25 mm long. They have not been observed to fly. 

These beetles do have a pair horns on the head but unlike many species in their subfamily Dynastinae, they lack the big singular rhinoceros-like horn. Both sexes grow horns but the females' are much smaller. 

As larvae, they have cream-colored bodies, reddish-brown heads, and three sets of legs. They have a C-shaped posture, and move on their sides when above ground.

Diet 
Adults are detritivores and scavengers. They will eat fresh or rotting plant matter and other dead insects. In captivity, they will eat mealworms, fruits, and vegetables.

Behavior 
Both adults and larvae prefer to be underground and burrow when possible. In captivity, they can be kept together or with other insect species with no indication of aggression, but they may eat wounded, weak, or larvae/pupae if they have the opportunity. 

They are not a popular species for keeping as pets or studying in their natural habitats, so information is still scarce.

Subspecies
These two subspecies belong to the species Hemiphileurus illatus:
 Hemiphileurus illatus illatus
 Hemiphileurus illatus mexicanus Endrödi, 1978

References

Further reading

 

Dynastinae
Articles created by Qbugbot
Beetles described in 1854